Bagh-e-Jinnah, formerly known as Lawrence Gardens, is a historical park in the city of Lahore, Pakistan. The large green space contains a botanical garden, Masjid Dar-ul-Islam, and Quaid-e-Azam Library.

There are also entertainment and sports facilities within the park: an open-air theater, a restaurant, tennis courts and the Gymkhana Cricket Ground. It is located on Lawrence Road next to Lahore Zoo, directly across from the Governor's House on The Mall.

History

The site was originally occupied by the Agri-Horticultural Society of the Punjab and had been planned as a botanical garden modelled on Kew Gardens in London. The garden was named after John Lawrence, 1st Baron Lawrence, who served as the first Chief Commissioner and then Lieutenant Governor of the Punjab, and who later became Viceroy of India from 1864 to 1869.

By 1860, when the first part of Lawrence Gardens had been laid out, the site had become a wilderness, partly used as a menagerie and the rest as a pleasure ground for badminton, archery and cricket. The first tree planted in the garden was in January 1862 and that same year Lawrence Hall was constructed for holding public meetings and theatrical entertainment. In 1866 Montgomery Hall was also completed and in 1868 the site enlarged through the purchase of land to the south of the gardens. By 1876 the garden contained 80,000 trees and shrubs of 600 different species including trees from the plains of India, Austria, Syria and southern Europe.

At the beginning of the twentieth century, Lawrence Garden began selling plants it had grown to the general public. Fruit trees were imported from across the British Empire, including grapes and mulberries from Kabul, peaches from Agra and plantain from Calcutta. In 1904 the Department of Agriculture became responsible for maintenance of the garden and since 1912 approximately seven acres have been managed by Government College University, Lahore.

Following Partition and the creation of Pakistan, Lawrence Gardens was renamed Bagh-e-Jinnah in honour of Muhammad Ali Jinnah. A statue of Lawrence, standing outside the nearby Lahore High Court, was removed in August 1951 and later moved to Foyle and Londonderry College in Northern Ireland. Lawrence and Montgomery Halls were repurposed for the Quaid-e-Azam Library in 1984.

Geography
The gardens are currently situated within .

Botany

It has almost 150 varieties of trees, 140 types of shrubs, 50 types of creepers, 30 palms, almost 100 succulent and about same indoor along with almost all varieties of annual flowers. The garden has a good name in Chrysanthemum shows, it was the first institute that started growing chrysanthemum and maximum no of varieties for it. It has 3 nurseries, 4 hilloaks in it.

Information and services
Bagh-e-Jinnah has two libraries, Quaid-e-Azam library and Darusalam in it.
Regarding collection of trees, shrubs and climbers a book has been published by Ch. Muhammad Tariq (DDA Jinnah Garden, Muhammad Ramzan Rafique (Agricultural Officer) and Dr. Muhammad Afzal (Instructor). (Flora of Jinnah Garden) This book contains common name, botanical name, flower time, type of plant (deciduous or evergreen), flowering color of each plant along with its picture. Furthermore, this book contains selective pictures from palm garden, annual flowers in this garden. This book can be obtained from the office of Jinnah Garden.
 The park receives a nostalgic mention of the 1970s and 1980s life in Bano Qudsia's Urdu novel Raja Gidh.
 The Park has a Tomb of a saint named Peer Sakhi Abul Faizul Hassan commonly known as Baba Turat Muraad Shah, with a heavy number of visitors.
 The park has a track of 2.65 kilometers.

Cricket ground 

Bagh-e-Jinnah park is a famous cricket ground since 1885, built for the entertainment of government officers and civil servants. Lahore Gymkhana Club had regular fixtures here. The ground played host to friendly matches, competitive fixtures and host to Pakistan's first unofficial Test against the West Indies in 1948. A few more unofficial Tests later, Bagh-e-Jinnah became a Test venue when Pakistan took on India in 1954–55. New Zealand and West Indies also played a Test here before Bagh-e-Jinnah lost its Test status as it played second fiddle to Gaddafi Stadium but still hosts tour matches involving visiting nations, especially England.

Images 

Below are some pictures of Bagh-e-Jinnah:

See also
 Bāgh
 List of parks and gardens in Lahore
 List of parks and gardens in Pakistan
 List of parks and gardens in Karachi

References

External links

 Bagh-e-Jinnah at CricketArchive
 Bagh-e-Jinnah at Cricinfo
 The Lahore Gymkhana
 Bagh-e-Jinnah (Lahore Gymkhana), WorldStadia

Lahore
Gardens in Pakistan
Botanical gardens in Pakistan
Parks in Pakistan
Test cricket grounds in Pakistan
Tourist attractions in Lahore
Cricket grounds in Pakistan
The Mall, Lahore
Memorials to Muhammad Ali Jinnah